Everything You Ever Wanted to Know About Silence is the debut album of American rock band Glassjaw, released on May 9, 2000 by Roadrunner Records. It was produced by Ross Robinson. Since its release, the album has received positive reviews from critics and has been cited as an influential album in post-hardcore, though in recent years there has been some controversy over the album's lyrical content, which was seen as misogynistic.

Glassjaw has been rumored to discourage the purchasing of this album due to their acrimonious split from Roadrunner Records. Instead, they encourage people to download their music via file sharing software, such as Limewire. Robinson claimed that the label showed no interest in the band until he pushed to have them signed and showed little interest after.

A remastered version of the album was released on March 24, 2009 with two bonus tracks: "Convectuoso" and a cover of Youth of Today's "Modern Love Story".

Background and recording
Glassjaw originally formed in 1993 after vocalist Daryl Palumbo and guitarist Justin Beck met each other working for a summer camp. Throughout the next few years, the group issued various demo tapes and EPs and experienced many line up changes. Their line up would eventually stabilize by 1999, featuring bassist Manuel Carrero, guitarist Todd Weinstock, and drummer Sammy Siegler. With this line up, the group booked a recording session with local producer Don Fury, and the demo recording that resulted from it would eventually be heard by producer Ross Robinson. Robinson, impressed by the material, would then show up to a rehearsal, after which he offered them studio time at Indigo Ranch and convinced Roadrunner Records to sign the group.

Recording sessions for the album lasted for about two months total. While all material for the album was written by the band before production began, Robinson did influence arrangements of the tracks "Hurting and Shoving (She Should Have Let Me Sleep)" and the album's title track.

Content
The album has been noted for its overall angry and negative tone in terms of lyrics. The title track was written about Crohn's disease, an intestinal disorder that Palumbo was diagnosed with in 1996. Many songs on the record were written concerning bad relationships.

Accusations of misogyny 
In a 2017 article by Pitchfork titled "Unraveling the Sexism of Emo’s Third Wave", Jenn Pelly addressed Glassjaw and the song "Pretty Lush" and criticised the band's lyrics for being "embarrassingly spiteful to bluntly-stated violence against women", leading to the band being accused of misogyny. Since the article's publishing, Daryl Palumbo and the band have made statements condemning the lyrics,  with Palumbo apologizing for the lyrics in an interview to The Guardian; “[the lyrics] deserve scrutiny. You don’t talk to a woman like that. It took being that angry to write [the debut album’s lyrics], to make it work for my instrument in the band. I was always like ‘Argh, revenge!’ Fall in love easily and then fall into hate easily. I didn’t have to say it that way … It’s stupid, you don’t speak face-to-face to a woman like that. I was angry. It’s offensive.”.

Reception
Everything You Ever Wanted to Know About Silence has received generally favorable reviews.

Absolute Punk reviewer namel praised the songs "Pretty Lush" and "Piano", but said some of the album's songs have cringe-worthy lyrics and criticized the track "Babe". In a retrospective review of the album, MetalSucks reviewer Mike Gitter was highly positive of the album. Gitter stated "Glassjaw laid down the bitchslap in-extremis" and regarded the album as a landmark. NME compared the album to "Jeff Buckley doused in napalm, crawling through a room full of broken glass."

Legacy 
Since the album's release, Everything You Ever Wanted To Know About Silence has been seen as an influential album in metal and post hardcore. Keith Buckley of Every Time I Die has cited the album as an influence, stating on Twitter; "This album changed everything for me." Oli Sykes of Bring Me The Horizon also cited the album as an influence on him, and that it inspired him to become a singer. Journalists Leslie Simon and Trevor Kelley included the album in their list of the most essential emo releases in their book Everybody Hurts: An Essential Guide to Emo Culture (2007). Alternative Press ranked "Pretty Lush" at number 77 on their list of the best 100 singles from the 2000s.

In 2022, Glassjaw have performed the album in its entirety during their 20+ Anniversary Tour.

Accolades

Track listing

Personnel
Daryl Palumbo – vocals
Justin Beck – guitar
Manuel Carrero – bass guitar
Todd Weinstock – guitar
Sammy Siegler – drums
Ross Robinson – production, mixing
Steve Evetts – mixing
Chuck Johnson – engineering
Ted Jensen – mastering
Kaz Kiriya – band photography
Paul Brown – image photography

Use in media 

 "Siberian Kiss" was featured in the soundtrack for Ginger Snaps (film).

References
Citations

Sources

 

Glassjaw albums
2000 debut albums
Roadrunner Records albums
Albums produced by Ross Robinson
Nu metal albums by American artists